CSAB may refer to:

 Cadbury Schweppes Americas Beverages
 Colegio San Agustin - Bacolod, an Augustinian school in the Philippines
 CSAB (professional organization), an accreditation supporting organization, formerly called Computing Sciences Accreditation Board, in the United States
CSαβ (Cysteine-stabilized alpha beta) defensins, a superfamily of proteins, also called cis-defensins